Cyclobacterium is a mesophilic, neutrophilic, chemoorganotrophic and aerobic bacterial genus from the family of Cyclobacteriaceae. Cyclobacterium bacteria occur in marine habitats

References

Further reading 
 
 
 
 
 

Cytophagia
Bacteria genera